Cefminox (INN) is a second-generation cephalosporin antibiotic.

Spectrum
Cefminox is a broad-spectrum, bactericidal cephalosporin antibiotic. It is especially effective against Gram-negative and anaerobic bacteria. The following represents MIC data for a few medically significant microorganisms.
 Clostridium difficile: 2 - 4 µg/ml
 Escherichia coli: 0.125 - 16 µg/ml
 Pseudomonas aeruginosa: 256 µg/ml

References 

Cephalosporin antibiotics
Tetrazoles